Needmore is an unincorporated community in Owen County, Kentucky, United States. It was also known as Bachelors Headquarters.

References

Unincorporated communities in Owen County, Kentucky
Unincorporated communities in Kentucky